Luc Leblanc (born 4 August 1966 in Limoges, France) is a retired French professional road cyclist. He was World Road Champion in 1994.

Biography
In 1978, a drunk driver hit Luc Leblanc, aged 11, and his younger brother Gilles Leblanc, aged 8. Gilles died after the accident, and  Luc was hospitalized for six months. After many operations, Luc was able to walk again, although his left leg was 3 cm shorter and weaker than his right leg.

Initially, Leblanc wanted to become a priest, but after a physiotherapist's advice to take up cycling to solve his leg problems, and subsequently Raymond Poulidor's advice to become a professional cyclist, he did not become a priest.

At the 1991 Tour de France, in the 12th stage Leblanc joined the decisive attack together with Charly Mottet and Pascal Richard. Mottet won the stage, but they finished 7 minutes ahead of the classification leader LeMond, which meant that Leblanc was the new leader.
The next day, Leblanc finished 12 minutes behind the winner, and lost the lead to Miguel Induráin, who would remain the leader until the end of the race.

The yellow jersey that he received for leading the general classification, he gave to Poulidor. His accident years earlier did lead to operations on his injuries, and in the 1992 Tour de France the effects caught up with him and he had to stop on the stage to Alpe d'Huez. Again, in 1993, his legs hurt, nothing worked, and Luc Leblanc wanted to end his cycling career. However, the last thing he decided to try was to switch to teams and he joined the Festina team.

The next year, 1994, was his most successful year. At Festina, Leblanc won the 11th stage of the 1994 Tour de France ahead of Pantani and Indurain, and in the 1994 Vuelta a España he won the mountains classification. Later that year he won the 1994 UCI Road World Championships.

As a world champion, Leblanc had many offers from the world's best cycling teams. He joined Le Groupement, but the team's sponsorship ended one week before the 1995 Tour de France. Leblanc moved on to the Italian team Polti. Here, needing operations on his leg again, the results were not as expected, although he won one stage at the 1996 Tour de France.

In 1999, Leblanc was fired by Polti, because Leblanc was injured and could not continue his career. Later, the Italian court decided that the dismissal was unfair, and Polti should pay Leblanc. In 2007, Leblanc sued the French and Italian cycling authorities and the UCI because he still had not gotten the money.

In 2004, Leblanc became team captain for Chocolade Jacques in 2004.

Later, Leblanc became a consultant for a French radio station Radio Monte Carlo during the Tour de France.

Doping 
After his retirement, in a trial against Richard Virenque in 2000, Leblanc admitted that he had been using EPO to prepare for the Tour and the Vuelta.

Major results

1986
 4th Overall Circuit de la Sarthe
1st Stage 2
1987
 2nd Road race, National Road Championships
 4th Overall Tour du Limousin
 6th Overall Grand Prix du Midi Libre
 6th Overall Étoile de Bessèges
 8th Overall Critérium du Dauphiné Libéré
 8th Coppa Sabatini
1988
 1st GP Ouest–France
 3rd Overall Tour Méditerranéen
 3rd Trophée des Grimpeurs
 4th Overall Critérium du Dauphiné Libéré
1st  Sprints classification
 4th Tour du Haut Var
 5th Overall Tour d'Armorique
1st Stage 2 
 6th Overall Paris–Nice
 9th Overall Grand Prix du Midi Libre
1989
 2nd Grand Prix de Cannes
 2nd Bol d'Or des Monédières
 3rd Overall Tour du Limousin
 4th Paris–Camembert
 5th Cholet-Pays de la Loire
1990
 1st Tour du Haut Var
 1st Grand Prix de Wallonie
 1st Stage 5 Critérium du Dauphiné Libéré
 2nd Bol d'Or des Monédières
 3rd Overall Paris–Nice
 3rd Overall Tour du Vaucluse
 7th Overall Grand Prix du Midi Libre
 10th Overall Critérium International
1991
 1st Bol d'Or des Monédières
 2nd Grand Prix de Rennes
 3rd Classique des Alpes
 3rd Trofeo Pantalica
 4th Overall Grand Prix du Midi Libre
1st Stage 5
 5th Overall Tour de France
Held  after Stage 12
 5th Overall Tour du Limousin
 5th Road race, National Road Championships
 8th Wincanton Classic
 10th Overall Tirreno–Adriatico
1992
 1st  Road race, National Road Championships
 1st  Overall Grand Prix du Midi Libre
1st Prologue & Stage 4
 2nd Overall Critérium du Dauphiné Libéré
1st  Points classification
1st Stage 2
 2nd Overall Tour de Picardie
 2nd Classique des Alpes
 3rd Paris–Camembert
 3rd Grand Prix des Amériques
 5th Overall Tour de Romandie
 6th Overall Nissan Classic
 8th Road race, UCI Road World Championships
 10th Cholet-Pays de la Loire
1993
 1st Stage 1 Tour du Vaucluse
 6th Overall Tour de Romandie
 7th Overall Tour du Limousin
1994
 1st  Road race, UCI Road World Championships
 1st Stage 1 Euskal Bizikleta
 1st Stage 4 Tour of Galicia
 4th Overall Tour de France
1st Stage 11
 6th Overall Vuelta a España
1st  Mountains classification
1995
 9th Overall Grand Prix du Midi Libre
1996
 1st Stage 7 Critérium du Dauphiné Libéré
 2nd Classique des Alpes
 2nd Giro dell'Emilia
 2nd Coppa Placci
 3rd Polynormande
 5th Overall Route du Sud
 5th Giro del Piemonte
 6th Overall Tour de France
1st Stage 7
 7th Overall Paris–Nice
1997
 1st  Overall Giro del Trentino
1st Stage 2
 2nd La Flèche Wallonne
 4th Liège–Bastogne–Liège
 7th Overall Tour of the Basque Country
 9th Overall Critérium International
1998
 2nd Road race, National Road Championships
 2nd Boucles de l'Aulne
 4th Overall Critérium International
 4th Overall Rheinland-Pfalz Rundfahrt
 6th La Flèche Wallonne
 7th Overall Tour de Romandie
 8th Trofeo Pantalica
 9th GP du Canton d'Argovie

Grand Tour general classification results timeline

See also
List of doping cases in cycling
List of doping cases in sport

References

External links

Official Tour de France results for Luc Leblanc

1966 births
Living people
French male cyclists
Doping cases in cycling
French Tour de France stage winners
UCI Road World Champions (elite men)
Sportspeople from Limoges
Cyclists from Nouvelle-Aquitaine